Elon James Gasper (born 1952) is the former Senior VP at VizX Labs and co-founder of 1980s era software company Bright Star Technology. Described by Ken Williams as "a genius ex-college professor specializing in linguistics," Gasper holds several patents relating to Lip Sync and other technology, and has been active in independent inventors' organizations and their public affairs advocacy.

Work
After Bright Star's 1992 acquisition by Sierra Entertainment, Gasper was VP of Educational Games and the driving force behind many notable titles, including genealogy product Generations, traditional game Power Chess, and others.

Personal life
Gasper is currently Vice President, Director of Research at Corum Group and lives in the Seattle area with his wife.

Gasper holds an M.S. in Computer Science and a B.S. in Biochemistry from Michigan State University. He is a successful tournament chess player and occasional puzzle composer.

References

1952 births
Living people
People in information technology